Cyril Jeunechamp (born 18 December 1975) is a French professional football coach and a former player. He played as a right-back or midfielder. He is the head coach of the Under-19 squad of Bastia.

Playing career
Born in Nîmes, Cyril Jeunechamp began his career at hometown club Nîmes Olympique, later playing for AJ Auxerre and SC Bastia when they made their way to the finals of the French Cup. In 2003, he joined Rennes, staying there for four years before moving to Côte d'Azur based side OGC Nice in 2007, he left the club on 30 June 2009.

On 18 June 2009, Montpellier HSC signed the Jeunechamp on a free transfer until June 2012. For the first time in the club's history, on 20 May 2012, it won the Ligue 1 title.

In December 2012, Jeunechamp was banned from football for a year for punching a journalist in the face following a Ligue 1 match against Valenciennes FC. The defender was unhappy with an article the reporter had written. He left Montpellier the following year and joined FC Istres, where he made 31 appearances before retiring in 2015, aged 39.

Coaching career
In September 2021, he was briefly appointed caretaker manager for Bastia, following dismissal of Mathieu Chabert.

References

External links
 Cyril Jeunechamp's profile, stats & pics
 

Living people
1975 births
Footballers from Nîmes
French footballers
Association football defenders
Nîmes Olympique players
AJ Auxerre players
SC Bastia players
Stade Rennais F.C. players
OGC Nice players
Montpellier HSC players
FC Istres players
Ligue 1 players
Ligue 2 players
Championnat National players
French football managers
SC Bastia managers
Ligue 2 managers